Dimitar Kostadinov (Bulgarian: Димитър Костадинов; born 14 August 1999) is a Bulgarian footballer who plays as an attacking midfielder for Septemvri Sofia.

Career

Septemvri Sofia
In the summer of 2017 Kostadinov was promoted to the first team of Septemvri Sofia. Spending the first two rounds on the bench, he made his debut in the third round league match against Slavia Sofia. On 24 April 2018 he scored his first goal for the team in a league match against Lokomotiv Plovdiv.

Levski Sofia
In September 2021, Kostadinov joined Levski Sofia as the first signing of new manager Stanimir Stoilov. In the following months Kostadinov enjoyed a regular starting place in Stoilov's starting eleven. He was particularly prolific in the Bulgarian Cup competition scoring four goals in three games, thus helping his team reach the semi-finals of the tournament. In March 2022, however, Kostadinov along with team-mate Zdravko Dimitrov were suspended from the first team due to disciplinary issues, later identified as gambling "addiction".

Septemvri Sofia
In the summer of 2022, Kostadinov terminated his contract with Levski after his suspension from the first team. He then returned back to his former side Septemvri Sofia.

International career

Youth levels
Kostadinov made his debut for the Bulgaria U19 team on 12 September 2017 in a match against Bosnia and Herzegovina U19.

Senior level
After his good plays for Tsarsko Selo, Kostadinov received his first call up for the national team on 14 May 2021 for the friendly games against Slovakia, Russia and France between 1 June and 8 June.

Career statistics

Club

Honours

Club
Levski Sofia
 Bulgarian Cup (1): 2021–22

References

External links
 

1999 births
Living people
Bulgarian footballers
Bulgaria youth international footballers
Association football midfielders
FC Septemvri Sofia players
Neftochimic Burgas players
First Professional Football League (Bulgaria) players